The A3 is a motorway in northeast Switzerland, running diagonally from France toward the southeast border, and passing by Zürich on the way.

The A3 belongs to the Swiss motorway network. It starts at the border in Basel, where it connects to French motorway A35. From the Wiese Motorway Fork, the route is shared with the A2.

At Augst, the motorway splits, with the A2 branching off and the A3 continuing past Rheinfelden and Frick.  After the Bözberg tunnel is the Birrfeld Motorway Fork, near Birmenstorf.  Here, the A1 and A3 share the same route as far as Motorway Interchange Limmattal, where the A3 goes towards Urdorf and the  Uetliberg Tunnel which was opened on May 4, 2009.  After Zürich the motorway weaves through the hills of the south-east bank of Lake Zürich.  It continues along the Walensee (Walen Lake), and on to Mels where it ends at a junction with the A13.

The A3 represents (together with a section of the A1) the most important connection between Basel and Zürich, and (together with a section of the A13) the most important connection Zürich–Chur.

Sections

Weesen-Murg 
A special feature is the highway section at Lake Walen. Between Weesen and Murg in 1964, the N3 center was opened as a main road and led by the six tunnels: Ofenegg, Weisswand, Standenhorn, Glattwand, Mühlehorn, and Stutz.

The highway section has been extended since 1986 with the opening of the Kerenzerberg Tunnel, which handles the road to Murg / Sargans. The old six tunnels and the road on the shores of Lake Walen were converted to unidirectional operation and now form the carriageway to Weesen / Zürich.

Zürich Western Bypass 
Since May 4, 2009, with the opening of the highway section between the port Birmensdorf and Zürich, the branch South- the last section of the so-called "Western Bypass" - the A3 motorway is continuous between Basel and Sargans.

With the opening to traffic of the new section on May 4, two existing sections of highway have been renumbered. The leader in the city of Zürich Autobahnast Limmattal - Hardturm (always officially recorded as N1) is now known as A1 (Switzerland) or A1H (Shuttle Hardturm) rather than A3. The leading out of town Autobahnast Wiedikon - Zürich south, the so-called Sihlhochstrasse is referred to as the new A3W (feeder Wiedikon).

Also initiated, with the opening of the Western Bypass, the first stage of the flanking measures pass the residential areas along the former "West tangent" in the city of Zürich. The existing road trains, which were used for urban transit highway connection endpoints and Wiedikon Hardturm, were temporarily contracted on May 2, each for one traffic lane in each direction. In the following months until the summer of 2010, dismantling will continue of the "temporary" transit routes to district roads (West Street and Sihlfeldstrasse) and urban main roads (Seebahnstrasse und Schimmelstrasse)). In addition to various structural measures that are placed on the axis of incidence via Wollishofen and Albisrieden, additional traffic lights are used to regulate traffic flow in the metering equipment and make the side-traffic into the residential neighborhoods unattractive.

Junction list

Notes

References 

 Westumfahrung (Website of canton of Zurich)
 Photos: A3 on Autobahnen.ch
 Photos: A3W on Autobahnen.ch
 Photos: A3 on Autobahn-Bilder.de
 Ausbauprojekt Rheinfelden - Frick (Instandsetzung)
 Gesamterneuerung Erhaltungsabschnintt A3/68
 More sources in "Motorways of Switzerland".

  from the German Wikipedia.

A03